Marsupella arctica, commonly known as Arctic rustwort, is a species of liverwort found in the Northern Hemisphere. It is present in Alaska and Greenland and has a European distribution confined to Scotland and Svalbard. The Scottish population was first discovered in 1989 and is restricted to two sites in the Cairngorm mountains - the Lairig Ghru and Beinn a' Bhùird.

The species occupies montane and alpine habitats, and in Britain is classified as a "Vulnerable".

References

External links
 Interactive map of the British distribution of Arctic Rustwort

Jungermanniales
Flora of Scotland